The Las Vegas Optic is a newspaper located in Las Vegas, New Mexico. Published on Wednesday and Friday of each week, it serves San Miguel and Mora counties.

History 

Founded in 1879 as the Las Vegas Weekly Optic., then owner and editor, Russell A. Kistler, revamped the struggling weekly into a daily paper, calling it the Las Vegas Daily Optic. In 1908, the Las Vegas Daily Optic was renamed the Las Vegas Optic

References 

Newspapers published in New Mexico
Newspapers established in 1879
1879 establishments in New Mexico Territory